Kayla Mack (born May 9, 1989) is a Canadian rugby union player. She represented  at the 2014 Women's Rugby World Cup. She made her international debut at the 2011 Nations Cup against . She also made her sevens debut in 2014 at the 2013–14 Sevens World Series during the Netherlands leg in Amsterdam. In 2016, she was released from the national sevens program to join the 15s side in preparation for the 2017 World Cup.

Mack studied Kinesiology at the University of Saskatchewan.

References

External links
 Rugby Canada Player Profile 

1989 births
Living people
Sportspeople from Saskatoon
Canada women's international rugby union players
Canadian female rugby union players
Female rugby sevens players